First National Bank is an historic structure located in downtown Clinton, Iowa, United States. Clinton architect A.H. Morrell designed the building in the Classical Revival style. It was built by Daniel Haring from 1911 to 1912. The two-story structure features a pediment and fluted columns flanking the main entrance. It was listed on the National Register of Historic Places in 1985.

References

Commercial buildings completed in 1912
Neoclassical architecture in Iowa
Buildings and structures in Clinton, Iowa
Bank buildings on the National Register of Historic Places in Iowa
National Register of Historic Places in Clinton County, Iowa
1912 establishments in Iowa